White yam refers to at least two plants in the genus Dioscorea:

 Dioscorea alata
 Dioscorea rotundata, native to Africa